Steven Lee Olsen (born November 25, 1985, in Newmarket, Ontario) is a Canadian country music artist and songwriter. He released his debut single "Now" in 2009 on RGK Records, taken from his 2009 debut album Introducing Steven Lee Olsen. He followed his debut single with the release of another single "Make Hay While the Sun Shines".

Olsen has also written songs for singers such as Craig Morgan, Garth Brooks, Dallas Smith, Rascal Flatts, and Kevin Borg, in addition to "Blue Ain't Your Color" by Keith Urban. He has also toured in the 2009 CMT on Tour Live show, along with Jason Blaine, Tara Oram and The Higgins.

In April 2014, Olsen signed with Columbia Nashville. Later that year, he released his major-label debut single, "Raised by a Good Time", which was certified Gold by Music Canada in August 2015. He released his debut album Timing Is Everything on his own label SLO Circus Records in 2018.

In 2021, Olsen signed a joint record deal with Universal Music Canada and The Core Entertainment, and released the extended play Relationship Goals, which included the 2021 CFL Song of the Year, "What You're Made Of".

Discography

EPs

Singles

Christmas singles

Music videos

Awards and nominations

References

External links

1985 births
21st-century Canadian male singers
Canadian country singer-songwriters
Canadian male singer-songwriters
Columbia Records artists
Universal Music Group artists
Living people
Musicians from Ontario
People from Newmarket, Ontario